Ernst, Bobbie, en de geslepen Onix (English translation: Ernest, Bobby, and the Sharpened Onyx) is a 2007 Dutch children's film. The film received a Golden Film for 100,000 visitors.

External links

2007 films
2000s Dutch-language films
Dutch children's films